This is a list of campus radio stations in Canada. Most stations listed here are members of the National Campus and Community Radio Association, or NCRA.

CJRT in Toronto, the first FM radio station in Canadian history licensed to an educational institution, severed its association with Ryerson Polytechnical Institute in 1974 and became an independent public broadcasting station financed by the government of Ontario. CKCU in Ottawa was Canada's first community-based campus radio station, broadcasting since November 15, 1975.

Note that this list may also include some stations which are or have historically been affiliated with colleges or universities, but are now licensed as community radio, rather than campus radio, stations. Such stations are marked with a † next to their call signs.


Internet

Closed circuit

Further reading
 Music in Range: The Culture of Canadian Campus Radio by Brian Fauteux, 2015, Wilfrid Laurier University Press

Campus